The Chapel of Saint Casimir is a chapel dedicated to Saint Casimir in Vilnius Cathedral. The chapel was built in 1623–36 after Prince Casimir (1458–1484) was canonized as saint. It was built and decorated in the Baroque style by Italian sculptors and architects commissioned by Sigismund III Vasa, King of Poland and Grand Duke of Lithuania. The centerpiece of the chapel is a faux marble altar which holds the silver sarcophagus with Casimir's remains and the painting Three-Handed St. Casimir.

History
Prince Casimir was the second oldest son of the King of Poland and Grand Duke of Lithuania Casimir IV and Queen Elisabeth Habsburg of Hungary. After his elder brother Vladislaus was elected as King of Bohemia in 1471, Casimir became the heir apparent. However, he focused on devotion to God and became known for his piety. He became ill (most likely with tuberculosis) and died at the age of 25. Prince Casimir was buried in a crypt under a chapel that his father reserved for the royal family. He was the first burial in this chapel. It is located to the left of the entrance and is now known as the Wołłowicz Chapel after Bishop Eustachy Wołłowicz. Other family members buried in the chapel were Casimir's brother Alexander Jagiellon and two wives of Casimir's nephew Sigismund II Augustus. As Casimir's cult grew and he was his feast was approved by the pope in 1602, his remains were taken from the crypt and elevated to the altar in May 1604. The old small chapel did not suit the new function to house relics of a saint but no space could be found for a new chapel until Bishop Wołłowicz agreed to swap his chapel with the royal chapel in February 1624. The old Wołłowicz's chapel was demolished and construction started for the new Chapel of Saint Casimir. King Sigismund III Vasa financed the construction and hired Italian architect Costante Tencalla for the chapel's plan. The construction was finished in 1636 and the relics were solemnly translated by four bishops to the new chapel on 14 August 1634.

Three-Handed St. Casimir

Three-Handed St. Casimir is an anonymous painting of Saint Casmir which hangs above his silver sarcophagus in the chapel. It features Casimir with three hands (he has two right hands that each hold a lily) and is considered miraculous. The legend has it that the painter wanted to alter the composition and painted the second right hand, but he could not cover the first right hand – it kept reappearing. The legend was first recorded by Bernhard Leopold Tanner in 1689. However, a study of the painting under UV light and X-ray during restoration works in 1982–1985 revealed that both hands were painted at the same time and there is no evidence of attempts to cover one of them. Three hands is an unusual motif in religious art. Povilas Rėklaitis cited an example of Trojeručica, an icon of the Eastern Orthodox Church, as a possible inspiration. The three hands are unique to this particular painting of Saint Casimir. While the figure of Saint Casimir was copied numerous times, the copies only have two hands.

It is painted on a thin  wooden plank. The overall composition is very similar to the woodcut published by papal legate Zacharias Ferreri in Casimir's first hagiography in 1521. The main differences are the third hand and that the woodcut is set outdoors, while the painting is set indoors. It is believed that the woodcut and the painting were completed around the same time based on a lost original. Possibly this lost original was a portrait completed while Casimir was still alive but lost during a fire in Vilnius Cathedral in 1530. The painting was touched up in 1594 as evidenced by an inscription in a Renaissance cartouche at the bottom which cites a line from Psalm 92: The righteous shall flourish like the palm tree: he shall grow like a cedar in Lebanon. Likely at this time, the original pendant which is worn by Casimir and which depicted Madonna with child was replaced by the Order of the Golden Fleece. Saint Casimir did not receive the order and it was likely added to appease King Sigismund III Vasa. The order is also present in the cartouche outside the chapel which records information about its completion in 1636.

Murals

The chapel has two expressive murals by Florentine artist Michelangelo Palloni completed during the restoration work in 1692.

The Opening of the Coffin of St. Casimir measures  and decorates the east wall. It depicts the opening of St. Casimir's coffin on August 16, 1604 during his canonization proceedings. The body in the coffin was found intact, 120 years after the burial. The saint is wearing a long red robe, decorated with stoat fur, and a ducal crown. Bishop , who wrote to Rome of a wonderful smell after the lid was lifted, has his hands raised to heaven in praise of the Lord. Kneeling at the head of the saint is Gregorius Swiecicki, the canon at Vilnius Cathedral chapter, who was entrusted with Casimir's canonization process. Jan Kazimierz Sapieha who commissioned the painting stands on the right; Virgin Mary and Saint Peter, dressed in clothes of the time, stand on the left. Around them are priests with long candles in their hands.

The Resurrection of Ursula measures  and decorates the west wall. It depicts the first known miracle of St. Casimir. After the death of a young girl Ursula, her father went to the coffin of the prince to pray for her and the girl miraculously resurrected. The artist skillfully depicts surprise and astonishment of the father, other relatives, and clergy.

Sculptures of rulers

The chapel has eight sculptures of rulers that stand in marble niches in the four corners. They are carved from wood and plated in silver. They were carved with particular attention to individualized details: attributes of power, clothes, facial details, hand gestures, and poses (they are turned a bit to the left or the right so they face the main altar better). The author, date of creation, and identity of the figures are unknown and are subject to speculation by art historians.

The marble niches were probably created in 1620s or 1630s but there is no mention that they had any sculptures in them until 1737 when an inventory listed eight wooden sculptures of kings and emperors. According to Marija Matušakaitė, the sculptures are of late Baroque style and should be dated the second quarter of the 18th century. This theory of the Jagiellonian kings gained popularity and in 1878 the names were written in gilded letters on the postaments: Władysław II Jagiełło (Jogaila) (reigned 1386–1434), Władysław of Varna (1434–1444), Casimir IV Jagiellon (1447–1492), Saint Casimir, John I Albert (1492–1501), Alexander Jagiellon (1501–1506), Sigismund I the Old (1507–1548), and Sigismund II Augustus (1548–1572). At some point, Lithuanian historiography replaced Władysław of Varna with Władysław IV Vasa (1632–1648). The writings since has disappeared, but these names are often cited.

Not all researchers agree with the traditional identification. Already in 1840 Józef Ignacy Kraszewski proposed that the sculptures depict royal saints but the sculptures have no symbols or attributes of sainthood. The sculptures are too detailed and personalized to depict abstract royals or saints. Matušakaitė suggested that one of the sculptures depicts Vytautas, Grand Duke of Lithuania (1392–1430), and not Władysław of Varna or Władysław Vasa. Mindaugas Paknys noted that two sculptures wear imperial crowns (other researchers considered them grand ducal caps as they are visually very similar) and suggested that they depict Camimir's grandfather Albert II of Germany, elected but not crowned King of the Romans, and Frederick III, Holy Roman Emperor, who raised orphaned Casimir's mother. According to Paknys, the other six sculptures depict Casimir's immediate family: grandfather Władysław Jagiełło, father Casimir, and brothers Vladislaus, John Albert, Alexander, and Sigismund.

Gallery

References

Bibliography 

Religious buildings and structures completed in 1636
Roman Catholic churches in Vilnius
Baroque architecture in Lithuania
1636 establishments in the Polish–Lithuanian Commonwealth
Saint Casimir